Lawton is a village in southeastern Van Buren County, Michigan, United States. The population was 1,900 at the 2010 census.

History
Lawton was named for Nathaniel Lawton, an early settler.

Geography

Demographics

2010 census
As of the census of 2010, there were 1,900 people, 730 households, and 457 families living in the village. The racial makeup of the village was 91.0% White, 0.7% African American, 0.9% Native American, 0.1% Asian, 5.6% from other races, and 1.7% from two or more races. Hispanic or Latino of any race were 9.8% of the population.

There were 730 households, of which 35.2% had children under the age of 18 living with them, 40.8% were married couples living together, 16.4% had a female householder with no husband present, 5.3% had a male householder with no wife present, and 37.4% were non-families. 32.5% of all households were made up of individuals, and 18.6% had someone living alone who was 65 years of age or older. The average household size was 2.45 and the average family size was 3.07.

The median age in the village was 38.9 years. 25.4% of residents were under the age of 18; 7.6% were between the ages of 18 and 24; 24.5% were from 25 to 44; 23.1% were from 45 to 64; and 19.2% were 65 years of age or older. The gender makeup of the village was 45.1% male and 54.9% female.

2000 census
As of the census of 2000, there were 1,859 people, 610 households, and 428 families living in the village. The racial makeup of the village was 90.75% White, 1.24% African-American, 0.75% Native American, 0.05% Asian, 3.98% from other races, and 3.23% from two or more races. 11.62% of the population were Hispanic or Latino of any race.

There were 610 households, out of which 38.4% had children under the age of 18 living with them, 50.7% were married couples living together, 15.6% had a female householder with no husband present, and 29.7% were non-families. 24.8% of all households were made up of individuals, and 10.8% had someone living alone who was 65 years of age or older. The average household size was 2.63 and the average family size was 3.12.

In the village, the population was spread out, with 27.2% under the age of 18, 7.1% from 18 to 24, 27.8% from 25 to 44, 18.1% from 45 to 64, and 19.8% who were 65 years of age or older. The median age was 37 years. For every 100 females, there were 83.9 males. For every 100 females age 18 and over, there were 77.0 males.

The median income for a household in the village was $36,250, and the median income for a family was $40,909. Males had a median income of $32,614 versus $25,208 for females. The per capita income for the village was $15,600. 11.5% of the population and 6.7% of families were below the poverty line. Out of the total population, 8.2% of those under the age of 18 and 16.7% of those 65 and older were living below the poverty line.

Notable residents
Henry Ford (1825–1894), Michigan state senator and Lawton village president (not to be confused with the industrialist Henry Ford)

See also

 List of municipalities in Michigan

References

External links

Villages in Van Buren County, Michigan
Villages in Michigan
Kalamazoo–Portage metropolitan area